Varanasi–Jammu Tawi Begampura Express is a Superfast train of the Indian Railways connecting  in Uttar Pradesh and   in Jammu and Kashmir. It is currently being operated with 12237/12238 train numbers on daily in week.

Service

It averages 56 km/hr as 12237 Begampura Express and covers 1260 km in 22 hrs 35 mins & 56 km/hr as 12238 Begampura Express and covers 1260 km in 22 hrs 30 mins.

12237 – leaves Varanasi Junction at 12:40 Hrs and reaches Jammu Tawi on 2 day at 11:05 hrs

12238 – leaves Jammu Tawi at 14:00 hrs and reaches Varanasi Junction at 12:30 hrs on 2 Day

The important halts of the train are :

Route & Halts

Traction

Both trains are hauled by a Ghaziabad or Tughlakabad-based WAP-7 electric locomotive from end to end.

Coach composition

The train has standard ICF rakes with max speed of 110 kmph. The train consists of 25 coaches:

 1 AC first-class
 2 AC II tier
 6 AC III tier
 10 sleeper coaches
 4 general
 2 second-class luggage/parcel van

See also 

 Himgiri Superfast Express
 Archana Express
 Kolkata–Jammu Tawi Express

Notes

References

External links 
12237/Begampura Express
12238/Begampura Express

Rail transport in Jammu and Kashmir
Rail transport in Punjab, India
Rail transport in Bihar
Transport in Jammu
Passenger trains originating from Varanasi
Express trains in India
Railway services introduced in 2010
2010 establishments in India
Named passenger trains of India